Indian Camp Creek is a stream in northeast Warren County and northwest St. Charles County in the U.S. state of Missouri. It is a tributary of Big Creek.

The stream headwaters arise just south of Interstate 70 and 1.5 miles east of Truesdale. The stream flows north and east passing under Missouri Route J and is impounded south of the Incline Village Golf Course at the Warren-St. Charles county line. The stream turns north and enters Big Creek at the St. Charles-Lincoln county line just west of US Route 61.
 
Indian Camp Creek was named so named on account of an Indian settlement near its course.

See also
List of rivers of Missouri

References

Rivers of St. Charles County, Missouri
Rivers of Warren County, Missouri
Rivers of Missouri